Altair is a municipality in the state of São Paulo in Brazil. The population is 4,186 (2020 est.) in an area of 313.86 km². The neighboring municipalities are Icém to the north and Olímpia to the east.

References

External links
  Official Site of Altair
  citybrazil.com.br

Municipalities in São Paulo (state)
Populated places established in 1959